Rita Grande was the defending champion, but lost in the semifinals to Émilie Loit.

Loit defeated Ľudmila Cervanová 6–2, 6–2 in the final to win her WTA title.

Seeds

  Émilie Loit (champion)
  Marion Bartoli (first round)
  Katarina Srebotnik (first round)
  Ľudmila Cervanová (final)
  Iveta Benešová (first round)
  Julia Vakulenko (first round)
  Ľubomíra Kurhajcová (quarterfinals)
  Maria Elena Camerin (quarterfinals)

Draw

Finals

Top half

Bottom half

References

External links
 http://itftennis.com/procircuit/tournaments/women's-tournament/info.aspx?tournamentid=1100010017

2004 WTA Tour
Morocco Open
2004 in Moroccan tennis